Hrachya Ghaplanyan Drama Theatre is a municipal theatre founded in 1967 by Hrachya Ghaplanyan. It is located in the Kentron district of Yerevan, on 28 Isahakyan Street.

It was opened with a performance of Vsevolod Vishnevsky's "An Optimistic Tragedy" in 1967, directed by Hrachya Ghaplanyan. 

The theatre has toured Russia, the United States, Georgia, Bulgaria, Poland, England, Romania, and Hungary, and has participated in several Shakespeare festivals. 

The theatre's program includes both classical and modern works, with over 100 plays having been staged in the theatre.

Today, there are 20 performances in the theatre's repertoire.

Staff 
Artistic Director

Since 1986, the theatre's artistic director has been Armen Khandikyan.

Directors

Hrachya Harutyunyan, Grigor Khachatryan, Robert Harutyunyan, Armen Barseghyan and Jean-Pierre Nshanyan.

Actors

The troupe includes Guzh Manukyan, Artur Utmazyan, Evelina Shahiryan, Robert Harutyunyan, Hrachya Harutyunyan, Luiza Ghambaryan, Lusine Kirakosyan, and others.

See also
Sundukyan State Academic Theatre

References

Theatres in Armenia
1967 establishments in Armenia

Theatres completed in 1967
Buildings and structures in Yerevan